The G. Carl Adams House is a historic home in Miami Springs, Florida. It is located at 31 Hunting Lodge Court. On November 1, 1985, it was added to the U.S. National Register of Historic Places. It is a work of Curtiss & Bright.

References

External links

 Dade County listings at National Register of Historic Places
 Dade County listings at Florida's Office of Cultural and Historical Programs

Adams, G. Carl
Houses in Miami-Dade County, Florida
Pueblo Revival architecture in Miami Springs, Florida